Niclas Anspach (born 22 July 2000) is a German professional footballer who plays as a midfielder for Regionalliga Bayern club SpVgg Unterhaching.

Career
Anspach made his professional debut for SpVgg Unterhaching in the 3. Liga on 9 February 2019, coming on as a substitute in the 79th minute for Marc Endres in the 2–0 away loss against Hansa Rostock. In January 2020, Anspach joined Regionalliga Bayern side TSV 1860 Rosenheim on loan until the end of the season.

References

External links
 Profile at DFB.de
 Profile at kicker.de

2000 births
Living people
German footballers
Association football midfielders
SpVgg Unterhaching players
TSV 1860 Rosenheim players
3. Liga players
21st-century German people